Dick Pointer (before 17781827) was an American frontier hero and an  African slave. He is best known for his bravery in the defence of Fort Donnally, in Greenbrier County, West Virginia, from a Shawnee attack in 1778.  During the attack he used a rifle to secure the front door against attackers.  Some years later, Pointer spoke before the Virginia General Assembly, requesting his own freedom in consideration for his act of bravery; he was emancipated in 1801.  He died in 1827.

See also
 Phillip Hamman

Notes 
 
 https://wvexplorer.com/2019/09/22/dick-pointer-grave-lewisburg-west-virginia-wv-slave/
 https://www.wvencyclopedia.org/articles/1891
 https://www.wvpublic.org/post/may-29-1778-dick-pointer-black-slave-helps-save-some-60-settlers-greenbrier-valley-0#stream/0

References

External links 
 

Year of birth uncertain
1827 deaths
African Americans in the American Revolution
18th-century American slaves
People of Virginia in the American Revolution
Virginia colonial people